The San Francisco Fog was a Major Indoor Soccer League franchise which existed for only one season, 1980–1981.

History
The Fog, which played their home games at the Cow Palace, finished their single season of existence at 11–29.  The team used The Eagles "Heartache Tonight" as their anthem.

On May 28, 1980, at the end of the 1979–1980 season, the owner of the Detroit Lightning, David Schoenstadt, moved his team from Detroit, Michigan to San Francisco, California where he renamed the team the San Francisco Fog.  It had few decent players and drew under five thousand fans per game.  After a dismal 1980–1981 season, Schoenstadt moved the franchise to Kansas City in May 1981 where the team flourished as the Kansas City Comets

Roster

Staff
 Dick Berg, General manager
 Johnny Moore, Coach
 Peter Simon, Public Relations Director
 Brad Jacobs, Marketing Director

Indoor year-by-year

External links
 MISL history
 Fog logo
 
 The Year in American Soccer – 1981
 Roster

F
Defunct indoor soccer clubs in the United States
Major Indoor Soccer League (1978–1992) teams
Soccer clubs in California
1980 establishments in California
1981 disestablishments in California